A device is usually a constructed tool. Device may also refer to:

Technology

Computing 
 Device, a colloquial term encompassing desktops, laptops, tablets, smartphones, etc.
 Device file, an interface of a device driver
 Peripheral, any device attached to a computer that expands its functionality

Warfare 
 Improvised explosive device (IED)
 Nuclear weapon

Other uses in technology
 Appliance, a device for a particular task
 Electronic component
 Gadget
 Machine
 Medical device

Arts, entertainment, and media

Music

Groups
 Device (metal band), American industrial metal band active 2012–2014
 Device (pop-rock band), American pop-rock trio from the mid 1980s

Albums
 Device (Device album), 2013
 Device (Eon album), 2006

Other uses in arts, entertainment, and media
 Plot device, as in storytelling
 Rhetorical device, a technique used in writing or speaking
 The Device, a 2014 American science fiction horror film

Other uses
 Dev1ce or Device, nicknames for Nicolai Reedtz, a Danish professional CS:GO player
 Device, something that can be trademarked, such as a logotype (or "logo") in printing or in law
 Devices, aspects of a military-award decoration in the United Kingdom
 Personal device, another name for a heraldic badge

People with the surname Device
Alizon Device (died 1612), executed as one of the Pendle witches
Elizabeth Device (died 1612), executed as one of the Pendle witches
James Device (died 1612), executed as one of the Pendle witches
Jennet Device, witness at the trial of the Pendle witches

See also
 Devise